Healing is the process by which the cells in the body regenerate and repair, as well as the psychological process of dealing with a problem or problems.

Healing may also refer to:

Alternative medicine
 Esoteric healing
 Energy medicine
 Faith healing
 Self-healing

Geography
 Healing, Lincolnshire, a village near Grimsby in North East Lincolnshire, England

Film and TV
 Healing (1978 film), a Canadian documentary film
 Healing (2014 film), an Australian drama film

Music

Albums
 Healing (Benny Hinn album), 1998
 Healing (Stevie B album), 1992
 Healing (Todd Rundgren album), 1981
 Healing (Ünloco album), 2001
 Healing (Weird Owl album), 2013

Songs
 "Healing" (song), 2021 single by Fletcher
 "Healing", a 1986 song by Deniece Williams
 "Healing", a 2021 song by JK-47 and Jay Orient
 "Healing", a song by Plastic Ono Band from the 2009 album Between My Head and the Sky

See also
 Heal (disambiguation)
 The Healing (disambiguation)